Osman Sagar is a reservoir in the Indian city of Hyderabad. The lake is around 46 km², and the reservoir is around 29 km², with total level of 1,790 feet and a capacity of 3.9 tmc ft.

History
Osman Sagar was created by damming the Musi River in 1920, to provide an additional source of drinking water for Hyderabad and to protect the city after the Great Musi Flood of 1908. It was constructed during the reign of the last Nizam of Hyderabad State, Osman Ali Khan, hence the name.

A princely guest house called Sagar Mahal, overlooking the lake and now a heritage building, was built as a summer resort of the last Nizam. Its location on the banks of the lake offers wonderful views. Telangana Tourism Department  operates a resort in the building. The breeze of the lake is very pleasant and has been popular with the locals since the Nizam's time. When Nizam consulted Sri Sir M.Visheswaraya regarding the twin problems of heavy floods in monsoon and acute shortage of water during summer, the latter designed a plan for construction of dam which needs high engineering skills in those days. This simple yet elegant solution solved both the problems for Hyderabad.

Tourist spot
It is a popular tourist destination, especially in monsoon season when the reservoir is full. Its parks, resorts, and amusement park are a major attraction. This lake had served drinking water to Hyderabad city but, due to increase in population, is not sufficient to meet the city's water supply demand.

Himayat Ali Mirza, great-grandson of Nizam VII has recently joined the “save Osmansagar and Himayatsagar” campaign for saving the twin reservoirs and has also urged the of Telangana CM to scrap the orders of GO 111.

Himayat said that now that the government had withdrawn the GO 111, the floods might affect various parts of the city. Scrapping of GO 111 has led to increasing the construction and concretisation activities near the lakes, ultimately resulting in consequent flooding.

Water levels
In June 2012, the water level at Osman Sagar was 1769.8 feet. On 1 October 2012, the level was 1771.8 feet, an increase of a mere 2 feet.

Similarly, in nearby Himayat Sagar, the water level in June 2012 was 1743.3 feet and on 1 October 2012, it was 1,747.4 feet, an increase of about 4 feet. In October 2011, the water levels at Osman Sagar and Himayat Sagar were 1781.9 feet and 1755.9 feet, respectively.

Images of the lake

References

External links

 Nature of Osman Sagar
 Birds of Hyderabad
 Flora of Hyderabad
 Butterflies of Hyderabad

Lakes of Hyderabad, India
Reservoirs in Telangana